Morepork Games is a small video game development studio based in Carterton, New Zealand.

The studio released its debut-game Swing Racers in June 2015. It is currently working on an unannounced Unreal Engine 4 game.

References

External links 
 

Video game development companies
Video game companies of New Zealand
Video game companies established in 2015
New Zealand companies established in 2015